Alexandra Dulgheru was the defending champion, but lost to Lara Arruabarrena Vecino in the second round. Arruabarrena Vecino went on to win the title, defeating Catalina Castaño in the final, 6–3, 6–2.

Seeds

Draw

Finals

Top half

Bottom half

References 
 Main draw
 Qualifying draw

Copa Bionaire - Singles
Copa Bionaire